Løkkeberg is a Norwegian surname. Notable people with this surname include:

 Georg Løkkeberg (1909–1986), Norwegian actor
 Pål Løkkeberg (1934–1998), Norwegian film director and screenwriter
 Vibeke Løkkeberg (born 1945), Norwegian film actress and director

Norwegian-language surnames